Xilu Subdistrict is one of the eight subdistricts of  Fangshan District, Beijing, China. It borders Wangzuo Town in the north, Gongchen Subdistrict in the east, Yanchun Town in the southwest, and Qinglonghu Town in the northwest. It had 75,903 residents as of 2020.

History

Administrative Divisions 

In 2021, Xilu Subdistrict administered 24 subdisvisions, including 17 communities and 7 villages:

See also 
 List of township-level divisions of Beijing

References 

Fangshan District
Subdistricts of Beijing